Nathan Amos (born August 11, 1979) is an international rugby union player for Israel. Amos is one of the only Israeli rugby players that played his trade abroad and is the most capped player in Israel .

Playing career

Northern Ireland 
Amos played for Rainey Old Boys Rugby Club in Northern Ireland from 2002 to 2011.

Germany 
He moved to play in the Rugby-Bundesliga for TV Pforzheim in the start of the 2011–12 season where Pforzheim finished as runners up.

In January 2013 he returned to Israel to play for ASA Tel Aviv Rugby Club with them he won the Israeli championship in 2015 and 2016.

International 
In 2005, Amos scored the winning try for Israel against the United Kingdom at the Maccabiah Games to secure the bronze medal. Amos was a critical part of Israel's promotion from the European Division 3C to 3B in 2009.

Personal life 
Nathan's younger brother, Danny, is a professional football player in Israel.

References 

1979 births
Living people
South African emigrants to Israel
Israeli Jews
Israeli rugby union players
Jewish rugby union players
South African Jews
South African rugby union players
Maccabiah Games medalists in rugby union
Maccabiah Games bronze medalists for Israel
Israeli expatriate rugby union players
Expatriate rugby union players in Northern Ireland
Expatriate rugby union players in Germany
Israeli expatriate sportspeople in Northern Ireland
Israeli expatriate sportspeople in Germany
Israeli people of Zimbabwean descent
Rugby union props